God's Learning Channel (GLC) is a religious satellite network based in West Texas which teaches a biblical point of view of Judaism. The network was founded in 1982 by Al and Tommie Cooper, who had the vision to bring Judaism to Southeastern New Mexico. The network later grew to five television transmitters located in New Mexico and West Texas. While the focus of programming has been to teach believers their ties to the Bible and the spiritual world, it has continued to expand to cover a wide range of themes related  to the Land of Israel and the Jewish people, presenting Jesus, in Hebrew pronounced Yeshua, as the Jewish Messiah.
 
GLC provides 24-hour streaming media of its broadcast (accessible through the GLC website), as well as internet platforms, such as Roku.

Stations
Abilene, Texas – KPCB-DT 17
Amarillo, Texas – KPTF-DT 18
Lubbock, Texas – KPTB-DT 16
Midland-Odessa, Texas – KMLM-DT 42
Roswell, New Mexico – KRPV-DT 27

Satellites
Galaxy 25 Ku-Band

External links
 Official Site

1982 establishments in Texas
Christianity in Texas
Christian Zionism in the United States
Evangelical television networks
Religious television stations in the United States
Television channels and stations established in 1982